Beyblade is a 2001 Japanese anime television series based on Takao Aoki's manga series of the same name, which itself is based on the Beyblade spinning top game from Takara Tomy. The 51-episode series was produced by Madhouse under the direction of Yoshio Takeuchi.

A second season, titled Beyblade V-Force,  was first broadcast on TV Tokyo in Japan from January 7 to December 30, 2002. The season was licensed for English adaptation, broadcast, and release by Nelvana. The series was broadcast on the sibling cable channel YTV in Canada and ABC Family in the United States in 2002.

The season uses four pieces of theme music: Two opening themes and two ending themes. From episodes 1-21, the first opening theme is "OFF THE CHAIN" by TOSS & TURN while the ending theme is "URBAN LOVE" by Shiori. For the English version, the opening and ending themes are "Let's Beyblade!" by Sick Kid ft. Lukas Rossi.



Episode list

References

Beyblade Season2
2002 Japanese television seasons